Pray for Me may refer to:

Films
 Pray for Me: The Jason Jessee Film, a documentary film about professional skateboarder Jason Jessee
 Francis: Pray for Me, a 2015 film about Pope Francis

Music

Albums
 Pray for Me, an album by YG, 2022

Songs
 "Pray for Me" (song), a song by the Weeknd and Kendrick Lamar, 2018
 "Pray for Me", a song by Michael W. Smith from the album I 2 (EYE), 1988
 "Pray for Me", a song by the Jayhawks from the album Tomorrow the Green Grass, 1995
 "Pray for Me", a song by Mobb Deep from the album Infamy, 2001
 "Pray for Me", a song by Sixx:A.M. from the album The Heroin Diaries Soundtrack, 2007
 "Pray for Me", a song by G-Eazy from the album The Beautiful & Damned, 2017
 "Pray for Me", a song by Reks from Grey Hairs, 2008
 "Pray for Me", a 2014 song by rapper Bizarre

See also
"Mama Don't Forget to Pray for Me", a song by Diamond Rio